Imre Horváth (19 November 1901 – 2 February 1958) was a Hungarian politician, who served as Minister of Foreign Affairs twice: in 1956 and after the Hungarian Revolution of 1956 until his death. In 1918, he joined the Communist Party of Hungary (KMP). Despite his young age, he was one of the organizers of the labour movements. During the Hungarian Soviet Republic, he worked for the political police. After the fall of the communist system, he was interned. After prison, he made connections with the illegal communist party. He was again imprisoned, for 10 years. He was sent to the Soviet Union in a prisoner exchange. He finished his studies and worked as an engineer in Moscow. In 1933, he returned home, but was soon arrested. For 10 years, he was held in prison at Szeged.

In 1944, the Nazis sent him to Dachau. In 1945, he returned to Hungary. He worked for some embassies. From 1956 to 1958, he was foreign affairs minister, except during the 1956 Revolution when Imre Nagy held this position. Horváth was the leader of the Hungarian delegation to the United Nations after the revolution.

References

 Magyar Életrajzi Lexikon

1901 births
1958 deaths
Politicians from Budapest
Members of the Hungarian Working People's Party
Members of the Hungarian Socialist Workers' Party
Foreign ministers of Hungary
Hungarian Communist Party politicians
Ambassadors of Hungary to the United Kingdom